Meta Caroline Orred (1845 or 1846, in Edinkillie, Elginshire, Scotland – 23 May 1925, in Bournemouth) was an author and poet. Though born in Scotland, she lived most of her life in England, where she produced her literature and poetry. The lyric for the 1877 popular song "In the Gloaming", with music by Annie Fortescue Harrison, comes from Poems.

Selected works
Poems (1874)
A Long Time Ago (1876)
Berthold, and Other Poems (1878)
Honor's Worth; or, The Cost of a Vow (1878)
Ave (all' Anima mea) (1880)
A Dream Alphabet and Other Poems

References
The Book of World Famous Music, Popular, Classical and Folk (1966) by James Fuld. 
Notes to CD More Songs My Mother Taught Me (Hyperion, 2002) by Andrew Lamb.

External links
The House of Beadle & Adams, Orred, Meta
More Songs My Father Taught Me

1840s births
1925 deaths
Scottish women poets